Laifour station (French: Gare de Laifour) is a TER railway station in Laifour, France, in the Ardennes département. The station is served by regional trains of the TER Grand Est on the line from Charleville-Mézières to Givet. There is no ticket machine.

See also 

 List of SNCF stations in Grand Est

References

External links
 

Railway stations in Ardennes (department)